Hello, The Future! is a nerd-folk band whose only permanent member is Nicole Dieker. She has been performing as Hello, The Future! since May 2010, when she recorded and uploaded one song a week to YouTube for 100 consecutive weeks.

The band has released several albums and often performs at pop culture conventions.

Although usually introduced as a solo act ("My name is Nicole, my band is Hello, The Future! and I am the only person in my band"), Hello, The Future sometimes performs and/or records with other performers or even a full backing band; Giant Robot Album was a collaboration with the band The Long Holidays.

Mink Car Cover 
In 2011 Dieker organized a charity project called "Mink Car Cover" (based on the They Might Be Giants album Mink Car) in which 19 different artists (including MC Frontalot, Marian Call, Molly Lewis, and The Doubleclicks) recorded covers of the original TMBG tracks to release a new version of the album. In addition to providing project management, Hello, The Future! recorded one of the tracks. The new album was released on September 11, 2011 (the tenth anniversary of the Twin Towers attack) to raise money for the FDNY Foundation; over $5000 in donations were raised from sales.

Kickstarter 
In August 2012, Dieker ran a successful kickstarter campaign to support the development of Geek Girl EP and Giant Robot Album.

Band members
Nicole Dieker studied composition as an undergrad at Miami University in Oxford, Ohio (where she performed with the Miami University Choraliers) and attended graduate school at Illinois State University.

Discography

Albums available on CD

 Infinity Right Now (Nov 2010)
 Sidekicks and Other Songs (May 2011)
 Hello, The Future! Gets Her Filk On at Philcon (Jan 2012)
 Geek Girl EP (July 2012)
 Mink Car Cover (Sept 2011)
 Giant Robot Album (June 2013)

References

External links 
 Hello, The Future
 Mink Car Cover
 I Tried To Be A YouTube Star And All I Got Were These Horrifically Embarrassing Videos

American singer-songwriters
Nerd-folk musicians
1981 births
Living people
21st-century American singers